This is a list of the major timeshare companies worldwide.

Timeshare companies

References

 
Timeshare
Tourism-related lists